Žaga is a settlement on the right bank of the Soča River in the Municipality of Bovec in the Littoral region of Slovenia. The turn for the road to Resia in Italy is in the middle of the settlement.

Geography

Boka Falls is a waterfall on Boka Creek in the northeast part of the settlement. There are also two other waterfalls on Globoka Creek in the western part of the settlement.

Notable people
Notable people that were born or lived in Žaga include:
Oskar Hudales (1905–1968), writer, translator, and teacher
Anton Ocvirk (1907–1980), literary historian
Stane Žagar (1896–1942), communist activist and people's hero of Yugoslavia

References

External links

Žaga at Geopedia

Populated places in the Municipality of Bovec